SM U-7 was a Type U 5 U-boat, one of the 329 that served in the Imperial German Navy in World War I. 
U-7 was engaged in the naval warfare and took part in the First Battle of the Atlantic.

Fate
Twenty-four crew were killed, and only one survived.

References

Bibliography

External links
Photos of cruises of German submarine U-54 in 1916-1918.
A 44 min. German film from 1917 about a cruise of the German submarine U-35.

Room 40:  original documents, photos and maps about World War I German submarine warfare and British Room 40 Intelligence from The National Archives, Kew, Richmond, UK.

World War I submarines of Germany
Type U 5 submarines
1910 ships
Ships built in Kiel
U-boats commissioned in 1911
Maritime incidents in 1915
U-boats sunk in 1915
U-boats sunk by German submarines
World War I shipwrecks in the North Sea
Ships sunk by German submarines in World War I
Friendly fire incidents of World War I